Andrzej Dybicz (born 1952) is a Polish former professional football player. He won the Polish football cup in year 1979 with Arka Gdynia.
He played 234 matches with Arka Gdynia and is one of the most notable players in Arka Gdynia.

References

Polish footballers
1952 births
Living people
Place of birth missing (living people)
Association footballers not categorized by position